Donna Theo Strickland  (born 27 May 1959) is a Canadian optical physicist and pioneer in the field of pulsed lasers. She was awarded the Nobel Prize in Physics in 2018, together with Gérard Mourou, for the practical implementation of chirped pulse amplification. She is a professor at the University of Waterloo in Ontario, Canada.

She served as fellow, vice president, and president of Optica (formerly OSA), and is currently chair of its Presidential Advisory Committee. In 2018, she was listed as one of BBC's 100 Women.

Early life and education

Strickland was born on 27 May 1959, in Guelph, Ontario, Canada to Edith J., an English teacher, and Lloyd Strickland, an electrical engineer. After graduating from Guelph Collegiate Vocational Institute, she decided to attend McMaster University because its engineering physics program included lasers and electro-optics, areas of particular interest to her. At McMaster, she was one of three women in a class of twenty-five. Strickland graduated with a Bachelor of Engineering degree in engineering physics in 1981.

Strickland studied for her graduate degree in The Institute of Optics, receiving a Doctor of Philosophy degree from the University of Rochester in 1989.
She conducted her doctoral research at the associated Laboratory for Laser Energetics, supervised by Gérard Mourou.
Strickland and Mourou worked to develop an experimental setup that could raise the peak power of laser pulses, to overcome a limitation, that when the maximal intensity of laser pulses reached gigawatts per square centimetre, self-focusing of the pulses severely damaged the amplifying part of the laser.
Their 1985 technique of chirped pulse amplification stretched out each laser pulse both spectrally and in time before amplifying it, then compressed each pulse back to its original duration, generating ultrashort optical pulses of terawatt to petawatt intensity.
Using chirped pulse amplification allowed smaller high-power laser systems to be built on a typical laboratory optical table, as "table-top terawatt lasers".
The work received the 2018 Nobel Prize in Physics.

Career and research

From 1988 to 1991, Strickland was a research associate at the National Research Council of Canada, where she worked with Paul Corkum in the Ultrafast Phenomena Section, which had the distinction at that time of having produced the most powerful short-pulse laser in the world. She worked in the laser division of Lawrence Livermore National Laboratory from 1991 to 1992 and joined the technical staff of Princeton University's Advanced Technology Center for Photonics and Opto-electronic Materials in 1992. She joined the University of Waterloo in 1997 as an assistant professor. She became the first full-time female professor in physics at the University of Waterloo. Strickland is currently a professor, leading an ultrafast laser group that develops high-intensity laser systems for nonlinear optics investigations. She has described herself as a "laser jock":

Strickland's recent work has focused on pushing the boundaries of ultrafast optical science to new wavelength ranges such as the mid-infrared and the ultraviolet, using techniques such as two-colour or multi-frequency methods, as well as Raman generation. She is also working on the role of high-power lasers in the microcrystalline lens of the human eye, during the process of micromachining of the eye lens to cure presbyopia.

Strickland became a fellow of Optica in 2008. She served as its vice president and president in 2011 and 2013 respectively, and was a topical editor of its journal Optics Letters from 2004 to 2010. She is currently the chair of Optica's Presidential Advisory Committee. She is a member of and previously served as a board member and Director of Academic Affairs for the Canadian Association of Physicists.

Awards and recognition

 1998 – Alfred P. Sloan Research Fellowship
 1999 – Premier's Research Excellence Award
 2000 – Cottrell Scholars Award from Research Corporation
 2008 – Fellow of The Optical Society
2018 – Nobel Prize in Physics
2019 – Golden Plate Award of the American Academy of Achievement presented by Awards Council member Frances Arnold
2019 – Companion of the Order of Canada
2019 – Honorary Fellow of The Canadian Academy of Engineering
 2019 – Fellow of Royal Society of Canada
 2020 – Member of the National Academy of Sciences
 2020 – Elected a Fellow of the Royal Society (FRS)
2021 – Appointed to Pontifical Academy of Sciences 
2022 – Awarded the insignia of Chevalier de la Légion d'honneu, the highest French distinction.

Nobel Prize
On 2 October 2018, Strickland was awarded the Nobel Prize in Physics for her work on chirped pulse amplification with her doctoral adviser Gérard Mourou.  Arthur Ashkin received the other half of the prize for unrelated work on optical tweezers. She became the third woman ever to be awarded the Nobel Prize in Physics, after Marie Curie in 1903 and Maria Goeppert Mayer in 1963.

Strickland and Mourou published their pioneering work "Compression of amplified chirped optical pulses" in 1985, while Strickland was still a doctoral student under Mourou. Their invention of chirped pulse amplification for lasers at the Laboratory for Laser Energetics in Rochester led to the development of the field of high-intensity ultrashort pulses of light beams. Because the ultrabrief and ultrasharp light beams are capable of making extremely precise cuts, the technique is used in laser micromachining, laser surgery, medicine, fundamental science studies, and other applications. It has enabled doctors to perform millions of corrective laser eye surgeries. She said that after developing the technique they knew it would be a significant discovery.

When she received the Nobel Prize, many commentators were surprised that she had not reached the rank of full professor. In response, Strickland said that she had "never applied" for a professorship; "it doesn't carry necessarily a pay raise… I never filled out the paper work… I do what I want to do and that wasn't worth doing." Strickland had not applied to be a full professor prior to her Nobel prize, but in October 2018, she told the BBC that she had subsequently applied and was promoted to full professorship at the University of Waterloo.

Order of Canada

Strickland was appointed as a Companion of the Order of Canada in 2019, one of Canada's highest civilian honours.

Wikipedia presence 
Strickland's Wikipedia page did not exist when she became a Nobel laureate. Her Wikipedia page was created thereafter.

Personal life
Strickland is married to Douglas Dykaar, who received a doctorate in electrical engineering from the University of Rochester. They have two children: Hannah, a graduate student in astrophysics at the University of Toronto, and Adam, who is studying comedy at Humber College. Strickland is an active member of the United Church of Canada.

Selected publications

See also
 List of University of Waterloo people

Notes

References

External links

 Faculty profile at the University of Waterloo
 
  including the Nobel Lecture on 8 December 2018 Generating High-Intensity Ultrashort Optical Pulses

Living people
1959 births
20th-century Canadian  women scientists
20th-century Canadian physicists
21st-century Canadian women scientists
21st-century Canadian physicists
People from Guelph
Nobel laureates in Physics
Canadian Nobel laureates
Women Nobel laureates
McMaster University alumni
Academic staff of the University of Waterloo
University of Rochester alumni
Laser researchers
Fellows of Optica (society)
Presidents of Optica (society)
Canadian Fellows of the Royal Society
Foreign associates of the National Academy of Sciences
Sloan Research Fellows
Scientists from Ontario
BBC 100 Women
Companions of the Order of Canada
Women in optics
Female Fellows of the Royal Society
Canadian women physicists
Members of the Pontifical Academy of Sciences
Members of the United Church of Canada